The qualifying rounds for the 1998 US Open were played from 25 to 29 August 1998 at the USTA National Tennis Center in Flushing Meadows, New York City, United States.

Seeds

Qualifiers

Draw

First qualifier

Second qualifier

Third qualifier

Fourth qualifier

Fifth qualifier

Sixth qualifier

Seventh qualifier

Eighth qualifier

Ninth qualifier

Tenth qualifier

Eleventh qualifier

Twelfth qualifier

Thirteenth qualifier

Fourteenth qualifier

Fifteenth qualifier

Sixteenth qualifier

References
 Official Results Archive (WTA)
1998 US Open – Women's draws and results at the International Tennis Federation

Women's Singles Qualifying
US Open (tennis) by year – Qualifying